Roman command structure during First Mithridatic War refers to the chain of command of the forces sent east by the government of Rome to exercise the Mithridatic War mandate, requiring those forces to defeat Mithridates VI of Pontus, who had evoked the ire of the Senatus Populusque Romanus (SPQR) by slaughtering all the Romans his adherents could find on a single, pre-arranged day, an event now termed the Asiatic Vespers. Previously in Roman history the war and the command structure would have been straightforward: the Senate would declare war, and the mandate to carry it out would be assigned to one of the two consuls elected for the year, with both being assigned if necessary, and ex-consuls being available as generals with the rank of proconsul. For a small war the consul might give the task to an immediate subordinate, a praetor, or if the task was small enough, a legate.

Beginning in the times of the Mithridatic Wars, the mandates and the chains of command were complicated by a second, parallel series of conflicts, the Roman civil wars. The tension between the Patricians and the Plebeians had produced a system of two parties: the Populares and the Optimates. The government itself was bicameral. The Senate was a body of officials appointed from the senatorial class. Its purpose was to issue decrees, which were to be carried out by the two consuls, who were elected magistrates. Elections were performed and laws were passed by the Roman assemblies, of which there were different types. They were considered to be the populus, "people", in the formula SPQR ("senate and people of Rome"). The people were considered to be represented in particular by another class of elected magistrate, the Tribunes, who could intercede in the decrees of the Senate.

Gradually the opposition developed that would lead to the end of the Republic.  The tribunes were primarily populares. They relied for their authority on the laws of the assemblies. The consuls and praetors were primarily optimates. They took their authority from the Senate. Until the times of the Mithridatic Wars, the system seems to have been operative, supported by the custom of making an informal agreement, English "deal," featuring a quid pro quo, "something for something," for each side. Livy's basic word for this arrangement is a verb, convenire, "come together". Appian explains in Greek that in the period of the civil wars, this arrangement ceased to be effective: the magistrates attacked each other with all the resources at their command.

Thus Sulla's forces going east in 87 BC to fight the Mithridatic war were faced with additional problems. The government on which they should have been able to rely for support was paralyzed by civil conflict of magistrate against magistrate. It was not always clear who was subordinate to whom and what their mandates were. Some Greek inscriptions found by archaeologists suggest a more precise view of the chain of command than can be gleaned from the historians. However the information from inscriptions is limited. For instance, in most cases the dates of the inscriptions are not known exactly. Only tentative conclusions can be drawn from them.

Supporting inscriptions

Honorific inscription at Hypata for Lucullus

Honor to Quaestor Lucullus
This inscription is a titulus, or text, on a broken, honorific statue-base found in a garden in what was ancient Hypata in Thessaly. It was published by IG in 1908, giving it an inscription code of "IG IX 2 38.

The word translated by quaestor is Tamias. "treasurur." There were different types. An unqualified tamias, a municipal financial officer, was responsible for public funds and property, a function performed at Rome by the urban quaestor. The supply officer of a military unit, equivalent to the military quaestor, was the tamias ton stratiotikon. The officer who handled funds for the temples was the tamias tou theou. Of this inscription Kern says (English translation from Latin):
"L. Licinius L.f. Lucullus (consul 74 B.C.) was quaestor and then proquaestor in Asia 88-80 B.C. Tamias can signify either (Dittenberger)."

The use of the term quaestor for tamias does not prove that Lucullus was not a proquaestor. Greek inscriptional language does include anti tamias, where anti is the word the Greeks used to translate Roman pro, "in place of." Lucullus arriving in Alexandris to request the use of Egyptian ships is an anti tamias, suggesting that tamias was simply quaestor. Subsequently, however he is quaestor pro praetore in charge of the fleet.

Despite the semantic ambiguity, the geographic circumstances point to tamias being quaestor. The dedicating agency is the koinon ("government") of the Ainianes, an ethnic name. The ethnic may be just a convention referring to any people living at Hypata, which once was the capital of the tribe, or it may refer archaically to the older Ainian League.

In any case this inscription is one of a class issued by Thessalian and some other Greek koina. In the previous century Rome subdued the Thessalian countryside by dissolving recalcitrant koina and rewarding cooperative ones. In the 1st century BC it was restoring koina and offering economic assistance to them coordinated through quaestores, which subsequently was occasion of an honorific statue. These inscriptions reveal the existence of a lower-ranking acting quaestor, the leg(atus) pro q(uaestore), which was to be expected as there were not enough quaestores to assist all the koina that needed it.

If the word Quaestor (tamias) can be taken to mean exactly that, then the year of the inscription can be taken to be the year Lucullus was quaestor. It must be earlier than all the inscriptions that refer to him as proquaestor. In that year, he must have served in some capacity to be honored in Thessaly. The first record of his being in Thessaly was in the year of his mission to arrange supply prior to Sulla's invasion of Greece in 87.

War had been declared the previous year, but due to the circumstances of Sulla's march on Rome, he was unable to act on the mandate. The next year he was no longer Consul. He brokered a deal with the Consuls of that year that he should prosecute the war as Proconsul. One of the Consuls for 87 was loyal to Sulla; the other soon broke the deal and brought charges that were grounds for impeachment against Sulla. Sulla had six legions. He could use them either to prosecute the Civil War or to take command in the east. If he chose the east, he knew that his enemy in the recently completed civil war, Marius, would return to Rome and that, without his legions, the populares would soon be dominant, and he would be cut off from the supply and support of Rome.

He therefore set up a supply infrastructure among the loyal Greeks, with the help of Lucullus. When he landed on the shore of the Gulf of Corinth in March 87 BC (or in another theory on the shores of Epirus) his first concern was for supply. Regardless of what ships he used to cross the Adriatic, they must be left in the Gulf. He and Lucullus devised a scheme of "borrowing" the wealth stored in temples.
 
That date was either late 88 or early 87, before March, the month of the invasion. Although the inscription suggests a date of 88 BC, it is not proof positive that the date of the quaestorship per se was not 87. The circumstances, however, are unfavorable to 87. If it was not 88, then Lucullus was not the quaestor that remained loyal to Sulla in the Civil War, but whose quaestor was he? Sulla could no longer hire a quaestor himself, not being Consul. Moreover, if he was quaestor in 87, Sulla had no legitimate authority to invite him further as proquaestor, which would have been up to the Senate, now held by his enemies.

The view that in fact Lucullus was Quaestor in 88 remains a strong one. His timetable as quaestor in 87 is too crowded. In 87 he had two months to accomplish an amazing number of tasks. He had to desert the Consul with whom he was elected to take up with Sulla. He and Sulla then had to decide to go ahead with the invasion of Greece and plan how to live off the countryside. Lucullus must then sail to Greece and travel extensively in the countryside of Central Greece contacting the provincial officers. He sets up a supersession meeting with Sura, then returns to Sulla. The time required for all these activities would be more credible as 6 months, rather than 2.

Ready at last, they sail to the Gulf and demand the promised supplies. The Siege of Athens begins. They raid all the temples. Now Lucullus must set up a mint and coin money. Finally, made propraetor and sent off to Egypt in the fall of 87, having been quaestor less than a year, he serves as fleet commander until 85. It was impossible for him to have been proquaestor, as stated in all his other honorific inscriptions.

Quaestor pro Praetore Lucullus
Whether his quaestorship is dated to the more easily explainable 88 BC or to the more difficult 87 BC, it was only his starting rank in the campaign. There is more evidence that Sulla found him too valuable for the supply officer role. He was of more use as an emissary and expeditionary commander. Toward the end of 87 Sulla sent him on an expedition again, this time to beg ships from Ptolemaic Egypt to counter Archelaus' battle fleet.

The request was refused by the welcoming but cautious Egyptian king, and he travelled the islands of the Aegean, working from the Roman naval base at Rhodes, which had successfully repulsed Archelaus. His purpose was to gather a contributed fleet from the islanders. He brought unexpected hope to the adherents of Rome who had not dared to oppose Archelaus.

Around this time the letters to the people of Mopsuestia, formerly Seleuceia, in Cilicia were written, which were engraved on a marble block for public viewing. The main text of the inscription replies to a request to Lucullus that the Temples of Isis and Serapis be granted the power of refuge. It was granted. An initial paragraph from Sulla underwrites the decision by Lucullus. The latter refers to himself as Quaestor pro Praetore (Tamias kai Antistrategos): that is, a former quaestor promoted to acting praetor. The date of the letter must be the end of the First Mithridatic War, as the pirates of Cilicia were submitting, with Lucullus perhaps making the decision in 86 BC, and Sulla ratifying in either 86 or 85.

If Lucullus was Quaestor pro Praetore ("Quaestor acting as commander") in 86, and Quaestor is to refer only to his rank, then he cannot also have been Proquaestor (ex Quaestor) in 86. And yet, if he was Quaestor in either 88 or 87, as the honorific inscription at Hypata implies, he must have been Proquaestor (and not Quaestor) in 86.

Honorific inscription at Larissa for Sura

An inscription from Larissa in Thessaly honors Q. Braetius Sura and is the only source stating his full name.

Sura is known for being the commander of the only Roman forces in Central Greece to resist the incursion of Archelaus there. According to the historians, Central Greece was not his regular duty assignment. He had been under the commander of Macedonia, who ordered him to the defense of Thessaly and Boeotia, which were being subdued, for the most part unwillingly, by Archelaus; i.e., they were mainly pro-Roman.

War had already been declared by the Senate. A war Consul had already been elected, who was Sulla in 88, and he had received the mandate, but he was unable to serve it that year dues to civil war. He sent Lucullus to Central Greece to announce to the Romans that he was coming, and to announce to Sura that he was now superseded, and was to report back to his commander C. Sentius in Macedonia province for the winter (88-87 BC). Any refusal to obey the order would be interpreted as another act of civil war. Sura obeyed forthwith, indicating the loyalty of the troops in the eastern theatre to Sulla and to the Senate.

The date of the supersession is the key date of the entire sequence of events in the First Mithridatic War. Was it 88 or 87 BC? Here are the exact words in translation of the major source of the topic, Plutarch in Sulla:

"But when Lucius Lucullus ordered him to give place to Sulla, who was coming, and to leave the conduct of the war to him, as the senate had voted, he at once abandoned Boeotia and marched back to Sentius."

The Senate had given the war to Sulla in 88. In 87 Sulla was not Consul and had no power to conduct anything except under the authority of the Consuls for 87. Unless directed by those Consuls as Quaestor for that year, Lucullus had no power to demand anything from anyone.

The coins engraved with Sulla and Manlius Torquatus

Proquaestor Lucullus leaves a vacancy

At the beginning of his consular career, Sulla was fortunate enough to find an incomparable Quaestor, Lucius Licinius Lucullus, who was able to be a confidant of all his plans, collaborate in operations planning, and serve as ambassador to rebel provinces and foreign states, all the while tending successfully to the duties of supply and finance. Expressing the full range of his capabilities, Lucullus was for the most part operating above his pay grade. He was better than the job he had. In recognition of this fact Sulla promoted him to acting fleet commander in 87, beginning with the task of procuring a fleet. He was lost as a Proquaestor for the remainder of the First Mithridatic War. The proquaestorial post was now vacant and must be filled.

Lucullus is said by Plutarch to have managed money for Sulla:
Most of the money used in Peloponnesus during the Mithridatic war was coined by him, and was called Lucullean after him. It remained current for a long time, since the wants of the soldiery during the war gave it rapid circulation

This was a lot to ask of a man who shortly was sent off to Egypt pro Praetore and whose name never appears on any Roman currency as moneyer. It is a safe presumption that, unless Plutarch made the story up, Lucullus set up the mint and perhaps designed the currency. He certainly was not doing any minting for the years he was in the Aegean serving as admiral of Sulla's new fleet, nor did he command any mints. From the fact that the money was very popular one might infer that the soldiers called it "Lucullean." They more than anyone else were in the campaign for the money Sulla paid, the metal for which he levied from the temples and as tribute.

Documentary evidence that Sulla had found a candidate appears from 82 BC, a successful year for him. In that year he had defeated all his enemies at Rome and declared himself Dictator (reviving the old position). He had sent for his repentant commander in Asia, Murena, who was now ready to accept Sulla's agreement with Mithridates. Lucullus had been relieved of his command of the fleet. He had been kept on nominally as Murena's Proquaestor, but he did not function as that. Either he was being allowed a long vacation or Sulla was using him to report on the situation. In any case he relieved Murena of command, re-assuming his old rank of acting commander, this time in command of Asia. He would never be Proquaestor again. His fate in the Third Mithridatic War, when he was relieved from the Consulship and from command as incompetent, to be replaced by another protege of Sulla (now deceased), Pompey "the Great," remained totally unanticipated.

The new currency

Sulla and Murena were planning a twin triumph of Asian victory in 81. In preparation for this victory celebration Sulla issued a special, limited run of coins now entitled (those that have been collected) RRC 367, according to the numbering scheme in Michael H. Crawford's "Roman Republican Coinage." It survives as a number of variants: 367/1, 367/2, etc. The coin legends all say the same, except for minor spelling variations. An example is given below:

The coin is an Aureus ("gold coin"), a then new type, designed (with the silver Denarius) for across-the-table payment of their wages to Sulla's men. A Denarius represented a day's wages; an Aureus, a month's. The obverse ("heads" in the American vernacular) represents the goddess, Roma. ECB originally had supposed it is meant to be Pallas Athena, without considering that such an interpretation would place the patron goddess of Rome's enemy, Athens, on its coin. Themes on coins are never sardonic. On the reverse ("tails") is a representation of a Quadriga driven by Sulla followed by a winged victory, probably a reference to the triumph he claimed in 81. Sulla would not be in a position to declare any such victory until he had won Sulla's civil war and had become dictator in 82 BC. The quadriga represents the triumph of 81 BC. He probably knew for sure that he was going to claim it after his victory of 82, but he needed Murena present, which is why he sent to arrest him. The minting therefore was most likely to have been 82/81 BC, in Italy, since the head is of Roma.

Sulla's coins at the time have a more or less standard format, perhaps a reflection of their military origin. On the obverse is the goddess, Roma. The abbreviated name of the moneyer also appears. On this coin the moneyer is a member of the Roman patrician family, Manlii Torquati, the founder having been Titus Manlius Torquatus (consul 347 BC). Approximately every few generations they acquired the Quaestorship and minted legal tender, usually with their own motif, including a Celtic torc (which the founder took from a vanquished Celtic opponent). The torc does not appear on this coin, and is not represented by the beaded circle. Torquatus is not a civilian. He is a high officer in Sulla's victorious army, assigned the rank and the position by Sulla.

The delayed epiphany of Proquaestor Torquatus

Lucullus was the last to hold the position of Military Quaestor in 87, but Torquatus does not appear until 82. So it is unclear who was the original minter of Lucullean currency. Investigation of the further identity of Torquatus in the hope of clarification is complicated by the fact that all the men of the Torquatus family bear the same name and so are indistinguishable on the written page. There are definite appearances of Torquati but the connections between the persons are speculative at best.

Putting aside the question of subsequent appearances, how far back can the known minter of Sulla be traced? How and when did Sulla meet and employ him? A presumption that he was the ghost minter of the Peloponnesus is by no means warranted: why would he not identify himself until 82? Between 84 and 82, all of Italy was torn by Sulla's civil war, of greater impact by far than his First. It was a virtual "Return of Odysseus." Torquatus apparently appears at the end of it on the side of the returned Sulla, but in what capacity is also unclear.

In 85 BC it appeared that Sulla had brokered a lasting deal with Mithridates ending the First Mithridatic War. Mithridates would retire to his boundaries, offer the Romans no further resistance, and pay reparations, in return for which he would be molested no more. Sulla retired in jubilation to Athens, where he shopped for antiquities, acquired the books of Aristotle and travelled about the now peaceful countryside. He sought treatment also for the first onset of the disease that would kill him in 78, a numbness of the legs.

Having had a rest, he wrote to the Senate. They had dishonored him in the legal pursuit of his duties, he said. He had been declared a public enemy. His honors were stripped, his property confiscated, his family driven into exile, and his friends murdered. As he was still in command, having never returned to Rome to relinquish it, as the law required, he was now coming home to settle the affair. The innocent had nothing to fear, but he would have vengeance on the guilty. The Senate was ordered to make restitution immediately.

Received and read, this epistle dropped chaos on Italy. The Consuls for the year, Lucius Cornelius Cinna and Gnaeus Papirius Carbo, both Populares, had been in the field recruiting against the day of Sulla's return. The Senate decreed that they should cease these activities, and they agreed, but illegally declared themselves Consuls for 84, to avoid returning to Rome for any elections. In 84, receiving intelligence that Sulla planned to cross from Liburnia on the Balkan side, they began ferrying troops to there. Some crossed; the rest refused. In the attempt to enforce authority using Lictors, Cinna (with his Lictors) was stoned to death. Carbo brought the troops back. Due to bad auspices no replacement Consul was elected. Still Sulla delayed his coming.

In 83 BC Lucius Cornelius Scipio Asiaticus (consul 83 BC) and Gaius Norbanus were Consules, both Populares. Sulla was expected through Liburnia. According to Appian, at the start of the campaign season Sulla left Piraeus, Port of Athens, with 5 legions and 6000 cavalry for the city of Patras on the coast of the Peloponnesus. There is no mention of how he got there, but any other method than ship would imply an unnecessary and troublesome march overland across the Peloponnesus or Central Greece. Plutarch has him making the latter march to Dyrrachium. Sulla could not have made both trips simultaneously, but his army included Greeks from Central Greece, including Macedonians. They might have chosen to use Dyrrachium.

In any case, 1600 ships ferried 46,000 men from Patrae to Brindisi, or 1200 ships from Dyrrachium, if you believe Plutarch, or possibly 2800 ships from both places with a round number of 79,000 men, taking control of the heel of Italy. They were welcome at Brindisi.

The inscriptional trail of the Murenae

Far-flung inscription at Messene honoring Commander Murena

This title on a statue base discovered in 1913 in the marketplace of ancient Messene in the Peloponnesus became IG V 1 1454. Subsequently, it was found to be one of a group of three honoring Roman dignitaries Murena, Sulla and Agrippa, all three dubbed as SEG 48 494 (Murena),495, 496, dated 83-81 BC.

There are some peculiarities with the presumption that they were actually there in a military role. First, the Peloponnesus was entirely at peace and fully cooperative with Sulla when he was before the walls of Athens, and did not need any Roman intervention or Roman commander. Second, Messene is far from the theatre where Murena was left in command.

The presumption that the Peloponnesus would somehow naturally be hostile to Romans is based on a gap in the main testimonies. In Appian, Archelaus, failing to take Rhodes, is impelled to subdue the rest of Greece by turning them against each other. Archelaus enters Central Greece in 88 BC with Achaeans (Gulf of Corinth), Lacedaemonians and Boeotians. Their compliance in the light of subsequent events is forced and temporary, at least as far as the Boeotians are concerned. The whole of Central Greece rallies around Sulla's eagles. Appian details the defection of Boeotia but says not one word about the Peloponnesians, allowing the possibility that they were still hostile.

Sulla did not have time for hostile Peloponnesians; in fact, he probably could not have kept his position in the Megarid faced with a coalition of Athenians and Peloponnesians. In Plutarch's Sulla he shortly sends out confiscation letters to the Temples at Epidaurus, Olympia, Delphi and elsewhere asking them to ship their treasures to the army in the Megrid, perhaps the Quaestorium at Eleusis — an absurd request to an enemy — and they are quick to comply. He then assigns Lucullus the task of establishing a mint in the Peloponnesus and striking much of the precious metal received into gold and silver coins to be used to pay the men, suggesting that the soldiers had the freedom of the markets there. If the Peloponnesians did not take much of a part in liberating Boeotia, at least they were on just as good terms with the Romans as the Boeotians.

There was no reason for the Romans to maintain a special command for the Peloponnesus or promote anyone to commander there. The command mentioned in the inscription must be the one granted to Murena (father) in 84 BC. The date of the inscription is the same as the one from Rhodes, the period between Second and Third Mithridatic Wars, when the Greek states were trying to reassure the Romans of their continued loyalty. The reason why it is so far-flung remains to be discovered.

Carian statues honoring Murena's sons

Among the main beneficiaries of Roman hegemony were the Karians, who set up an unusual number of statues with honorific tituli in this period. As well as A. Varro and his mother Paulla Terentia the honorands include the two sons of Sulla's Murena, Lucius and Gaius. Lucius is commemorated on a white marble base with cuttings for an equestrian statue.

Gaius is commemorated on a circular white marble base with cuttings for a standing statue.

Probably both sons departed Rome with their father early in 87 and remained with him throughout.  Cicero ignores Gaius and only mentions young Lucius' service to his father at this time,  as well as his participation in the father's eventual triumph. But Gaius' foot-statue erected along with the mounted ikon of their father, indicates that he was already 15 turning 16 in 87(R) and thus (just) old enough for a position on his father's staff. Gaius Murena's participation in this long period of eastern service in company with his own family and his adfinis Aulus Varro is significant to the history of Varrones Murenae, since it was most likely Gaius who made the son of his father's long-serving legatus his heir by testamentary adoption, thus creating the name Terentius Varro Murena for the first time (in 47 or 46 BC).

The inscriptional trail of the Varrones

Carian statue honoring Varro's mother

A round statue base from Selimiye thought to have been taken there from Euromos (Karia) registers Varro's mother's name, Paula (Pōlla) Terentia, and her presence in the east, probably among the numerous noble men and women who fled Rome and Italy during and immediately subsequent to the bellum Octavianum. While Sulla was away from Rome conducting operations against Mithridates his enemies persecuted and proscribed his friends and supporters and their families, causing them to seek refuge with his army in the east. This exodus was the prelude to Sulla's civil war. The inscription is therefore dated to no later than 82 BC.

Bilingual text from Delos honoring fleet commander Varro
The bilingual text from Delos appears to be the latest known which includes the Roman ethnic, which is missing from the statue titulus for his mother.

Muster of the ship from Cos

A stele thought to have been set up at Samothrace.  lists all the officers, specialist crew and marines who served aboard a quadrireme (tetreres) from Kos under the ship's captain (trierarchos) Kleonikos and the, evidently Rhodian, admiral (nauarchos) Eudamas.  At the very top of the list A. Terentius A. f. Varro legatus appears as commander of the entire fleet (or perhaps "expedition"):  ΤΟΥ ΣΤΟΛΟΥ ΠΑΝΤΟΣ.
In combination with the  Rhodian titulus in which he and Murena imperator are singled out from the other three senior officials as public proxenoi and benefactors of the Rhodian damos, this document demonstrates that A. Varro was Murena's principal fleet commander in the joint land and sea operations with the Rhodians in 84. Appian entirely omits these in his account of the Mithridatic Wars, but briefly alludes to Murena's anti-piracy campaign in the later context of the famous Pompeian bellum Piraticum.  In his extant geography Strabo (XIII 4.17 = 631 ed.Casaubon) briefly alludes to Murena overrunning the Milyas and deposing the last tyrant of Kibyra, Moagetes.  He no doubt covered these events in detail in his (lost) Historiai.

References

Bibliography
 
 
 
 
 
 

Military of ancient Rome
Mithridatic Wars